Zamana is a 1993 Pakistani film directed by Mohammad Javed Fazil, starring Sultan Rahi, Javed Sheikh and Humayun Qureshi. It premiered on 19 November 1993.

Crew
 Production Company - Shahina Productions
 Music Director - Ashfaq Ali
 Lyricists - Abdullah and Yasin Hazin
 Playback Singers - Noor Jehan

References

1993 films
Punjabi-language Pakistani films
Pakistani action films
1990s Punjabi-language films
1993 action films